Edwin Louis Fisher (born May 31, 1949 in Stockton, California) is a former professional American football guard who played nine seasons in the National Football League. He later played for the Los Angeles Express of the United States Football League. Fisher attended Arizona State University.

External links
NFL.com player page

1949 births
Living people
Players of American football from Stockton, California
American football offensive guards
Arizona State Sun Devils football players
Houston Oilers players
Los Angeles Express players